JKU may refer to:
 JKU FC, a Zanzibari football club
 Jeep Wrangler, 2007–2017  models
 Johannes Kepler University Linz, in Austria
 Labir language, spoken in Nigeria